Malverina is a grape variety used for making white wine. It was created in former Czechoslovakia by a group called Vine Research Centre Resistant. Malverina is a result of an inter-specific breeding "Rakish" (Villard Blanc × Roter Veltliner) × "Merlan" (Merlot x Seibel 13666). It exhibits high resistance against both powdery and downy mildew, thus it is suitable for producing wines in limited-spray vineyards. Grapes ripen in mid-October. It is grown in Moravia. High quality wines aged in bottles are full-bodied with distinctive cinnamon aroma and with long persistence.

References

Hybrid grape varieties